Sweet Harmony may refer to:
"Sweet Harmony" (Liquid song), 1992
"Sweet Harmony" (The Beloved song), 1993
Sweet Harmony (album), a 1976 album by Maria Muldaur
"Sweet Harmony", a 2013 song by Slow Knights from the album Cosmos
"Sweet Harmony", a 1973 song by Smokey Robinson from the album Smokey